Nripesh Biswas (born 9 April 1937) is an Indian former cricketer. He played two first-class matches for Bengal in 1963/64.

See also
 List of Bengal cricketers

References

External links
 

1937 births
Living people
Indian cricketers
Bengal cricketers
Cricketers from Kolkata